Veikko Hänninen (4 April 1929 – 24 January 1981) was a Finnish chess player and writer, Finnish Chess Championship medalist (1956).

Biography
In the second half of 1950s, Veikko Hänninen was one of Finland's leading chess players. In Finnish Chess Championships he has won silver (1956) medal. In 1957, in Wageningen Veikko Hänninen participated in World Chess Championship Zonal tournament.

Veikko Hänninen played for Finland in the Chess Olympiads:
 In 1956, at first reserve board in the 12th Chess Olympiad in Moscow (+1, =3, -1).

Veikko Hänninen was also known as a writer. The his main work is The Fishing Line (Gummerus 1978). The book tells about fishing (primarily northern pike fishing).

References

External links

Veikko Hänninen chess games at 365chess.com

1929 births
1981 deaths
Sportspeople from Jyväskylä
Finnish chess players
Finnish writers
Chess Olympiad competitors
20th-century chess players
20th-century Finnish people